Helianthostylis is a genus of trees in the family Moraceae, native to South America.

Taxonomy
The genus Helianthostylis contains the following species:

 Helianthostylis sprucei Baill.
 Helianthostylis steyermarkii C.C.Berg

References

Moraceae
Moraceae genera
Taxa named by Henri Ernest Baillon